This is a list of characters from the light novel, anime, and manga series The Familiar of Zero.

Main characters

Louise

 is introduced as a second-year student at the Tristain Academy of Magic. She is the third daughter of the Vallière family, an aristocratic family well known in Tristain. Louise is a very stubborn girl, but, as Henrietta mentions, her heart is pure. However, Louise is nicknamed "Louise the Zero" for her seemingly poor magic abilities that usually result in explosions, and she masks her insecurity and hurt feelings by a show of arrogance. Louise constantly defends her honor as a benevolent person; she states that it is her responsibility as a noble to ensure Princess Henrietta's safety and to see to her familiar's well-being. During the ceremony when all second-year students summon their familiars, Louise summons an ordinary human, Saito Hiraga. At first, Louise treats Saito as a slave or pet, having him wash her clothes and having him lay on a bed of straw. Louise quickly becomes jealous whenever Saito interacts with other girls and punishes him regularly by whipping him with a riding crop or blowing him up with her magic. However, as the series progresses, Louise begins to develop feelings towards Saito and eventually falls in love with him. In the 14th light novel, their relationship becomes deconstructive when, in order to counteract Joseph's invasion in Romalia, Louise had Tiffania erase her memories of Saito so that she won't be corrupted. Saito however restored Louise's memory by sharing his own via kiss, after which she develops a tsundere trait.

During Albion's invasion of Tristain, Louise discovers that she is an extremely rare Void Mage, an element descended from Brimir the founder of Harkeginia 6,000 years ago, which explains her consistent failure to perform other forms of magic. Her Void spell is 'Explosion'; when released, her powers can easily destroy armies, yet takes time beforehand to cast it. Louise casts off her status as an aristocrat in order to rescue her classmate Tabitha when she is taken prisoner by her uncle. After they return, the Queen of Tristain adopts Louise as a sister, which makes Louise second in line to the throne. Louise became a priestess, along with Tiffa, for the Pope's anniversary enthronement.

At the end of the fourth anime series, Louise and Saito defeat the Ancient Dragon and affirm their love for each other and are married. After the wedding, Louise uses her 'World Door' spell to go to Japan with Saito and visit his parents.

Louise is named after Louise de La Vallière, a French noblewoman who was the mistress of Louis XIV of France from 1661 to 1667. In 2007, Rie Kugimiya was nominated for Best Actress in a Leading Role at the first Seiyu Awards for her work in voicing Louise.
 She was named the third-most popular Rie Kugimiya character by an Anime! Anime! poll on Kugimiya's 39th birthday in 2018.
 Comic Book Resources named her the "Weakest Isekai Hero" and ranked her as the worst tsundere character, stating that she "is much more than just a textbook example of a tsundere" and that "she creates one of the slowest burning, most annoying build-ups to a relationship that ever had the misfortune of actually happening."
 Capsule Computers considered Louise unique in that while "[m]ost characters held a reasonable degree of emotion when speaking, [...] Louise was definitely the stand out character from a vocal standpoint."
 Her solo character CD, released on 10 October 2007, charted on #187 on the Oricon Singles Chart on 22 October. Her Princesse no Rondo album was released on 3 September 2008 and charted at #141 on 15 September 2008. Her character song album, Zero no Tsukaima Louise BEST, was released on 4 February 2009 and charted at #58 on 16 February. Her F drama CD album with Henrietta was released on 21 March 2012.

Saito Hiraga

 is a human who was summoned from Tokyo, Japan to be Louise's familiar. While walking home along a busy Tokyo street, a portal suddenly opened in front of him. When he touched it, he was sucked through and found himself in Harkeginia and meets Louise (in the light novel he kept his laptop). He was officially bonded as Louise's familiar by a sealing kiss, which shocked him. At first, Louise and Saito do not get along and Louise treated him quite poorly. However, as the series progresses, the two eventually come to understand each other and fall in love. Whenever Saito pays any attention to another girl, especially that girl's chest, Louise is quick to punish him. In the anime, Saito's punishment is usually a whipping from Louise's riding crop or a blast from her void explosion spell.

When Louise forms her familiar contract with Saito, the runes "" are inscribed on Saito's left hand. As the series progresses, it is revealed that a Gandálfr exists to protect a Void Mage as they cast their spells. After being mortally wounded from fighting Albion's army at the end of the second anime season, Saito is revived by Tiffania, but he loses his Gandálfr power  until Louise re-summons him and renews his contract. He is then knighted by Henrietta and made vice-captain of the student Undine Knights led by Guiche.

In the fourth anime season, after Saito becomes the lord of the region called De Ornielle, Saito becomes not just Louise's familiar, but also Tiffania's familiar, gaining a new familiar ability known as  that allows him to boost Void magic to the user he touches (his life-force is drained every time he uses this ability). This ability was depleted after fighting the Ancient Dragon, according to Derflinger. When they fought the Ancient Dragon, and fail to destroy it the first time, Louise sends Saito back to his world using the World Door. Later, Saito manages to come back through a solar eclipse with a F-2A Jet Fighter, and they then destroy the Ancient Dragon permanently.

Saito's weapon is a cheap sword Louise bought, which turns out to be the talking sword Derflinger (Derf). Derflinger later reveals that he was once the partner of Gandálfr from 6,000 years ago, and that it was no coincidence that Saito and Derflinger are now partners. Derflinger has the ability to absorb spells. He was destroyed in Saito's first confrontation with the Ancient Dragon, but returns as he was actually dormant inside of Gandálfr. Saito is named after Gennai Hiraga, who was a Japanese scientist from the Edo period, and his name is written as "ability man". At the end of the fourth anime series, Saito and Louise are married.
Capsule Computers cited his sarcasm as his "most well performed moment" and called his power "interesting".
His F drama CD album with Guiche and Julio was released on 21 March 2012.

Tristain Academy of Magic

Students

Tabitha

 is a quiet girl who is a classmate of Louise, and best friend of Kirche. She is usually focused on a book and uses a large curved staff for her wand. She does not show any emotion on her face, says little about herself, and often does not respond to questions or gives short incomplete answers. During the first season, it was explained that Tabitha's mother had been driven insane due to the effects of a particularly potent poison that had been meant for Tabitha. The name 'Tabitha' originally belonged to a doll given to Tabitha by her mother; Tabitha's mother views the doll as her daughter, and her real daughter as a mere outsider who threatens to tear the family apart. Percerin, the family's butler, claims it was a combination of the events of her father's murder and her mother's madness and later the harsh treatment from her usurping uncle that drove a previously lively and open Tabitha to become introverted.
Tabitha is a triangle mage who specializes in Wind magic. Tabitha later 'levels' to a square Water/Wind mage equal to Ice magic. She is also a chevalier knight, which is the lowest rank of knight. By the end of the third season, she starts to develop feelings for Saito after he rescues her. Tabitha's familiar is Sylphid aka Illococoo, a nature dragon. In the fourth season, Tabitha is given a potion that restores her mother's sanity. Soon after Tabitha is declared the heir to the throne of Gallia, but postpones the coronation to live with Saito in De Ornielle with Louise and Siesta. Later, Tabitha made her decision and becomes the new queen of Gallia. In the novel, she has a twin sister called Josette, who is Julio's lover and a Void mage after Joseph.
Her character CD, which she shares with Kirche, was released on 21 September 2006. Her Princesse no Rondo album was released on 24 September 2008 and charted at #206 on 6 October. Her F drama CD album with Siesta was released on 21 March 2012.

Kirche

A triangle fire mage and Louise's classmate,  is from a military family in Germania. She attends the Academy rather than a local school because she developed a bad reputation for misbehaving. She has dark skin, red hair, and a large bust, and loves to use her looks to her advantage, fully aware of the effect she has on men. Fire magic is her specialty, drawn from her passionate nature. She enjoys making fun of Louise as her family and the La Vallières are rivals. She is flirtatious and has dated (and according to the light novels, heavily implied that she has slept with) many of the Academy boys, but Kirche is especially smitten with Saito. Often her affections for Saito result in his getting punished by Louise. By the third series, her interest in Saito seems to have diminished and her affections now appear to be directed toward Colbert. In addition, she seemed to rather have softened a bit towards Louise, though only in critical situations. Kirche's familiar is a salamander, named Flame. Her name ironically means 'Church' in German. In another stroke of irony, she winds up falling in love with an older man, when, previously, her refusal to marry one is what led to her being enrolled at the academy. In the fourth anime series, she and Momorency are seen spending much more time together, as Tabitha has left the school to rule over her kingdom. However like the other girls, she is still in love with Saito (as much as before) and wants to be with him. Her name is a reference to the birth name of Catherine the Great.
Capsule Computers cited her seduction as her "most well performed moment".
Her character CD, which she shares with Tabitha, was released on 21 September 2006.

Guiche

 is one of Louise's classmates who, despite being in love with Montmorency, is a vain playboy who often flirts with other women. He comes from a noble family with a deep military history; his father is a general. His wand is in the form of a long stemmed rose, and he specializes in Earth magic, and summoning Valkyries. He likes to dote upon his familiar, a giant mole named Verdandi.
When Saito exposes Guiche's two-timing activities, Guiche is offended and challenges Saito to a duel, only to lose when Saito's runes on his hand activates. As a result, Guiche becomes self-conscious of his fighting abilities and a little cowardly during conflicts, but tries to help his classmates anyway. Guiche and the academy boys join the army for the Albion war; in the light novels, Guiche was placed into a ragtag battalion with low morale. His company was the first one into the City of South Gotha, where he was mortally wounded in battle but then revived by a fairy; Tiffania. In the third anime season, Guiche becomes a captain of the student Undine Knights, and he makes Saito his vice-captain.
 His character CD (which he shares with Momorency) was released on 6 September 2006. His F drama CD album with Julio and Saito was released on 21 March 2012.

Montmorency

 is Louise's classmate. Like most Tristain nobles, she has a great deal of pride. She also had made a contract with a Water Spirit. She has feelings for Guiche, but remains jealous whenever Guiche flirts with other girls. In the first anime season, she creates a love potion but Louise unintentionally drinks it and falls for Saito. She is one of the few prominent female characters not competing for Saito's affection. Momorency's familiar is a frog named Robin, and her specialty is Water magic where she summons the Water Spirit that has helped out her family before. Although relegated to more of a supporting position in the first two anime series, her importance gradually increased as she started being included in the missions and spending more time with the main cast of characters. By the fourth series, she and Kirche are also shown to have grown closer, frequently spending more time together after Tabitha has left to rule her kingdom. Her code name is Montmorency the Perfume.
 Her character CD (which he shares with Guiche) was released on 6 September 2006.

Beatrice

 is a student introduced in the third anime season. She is a noble princess of a small but powerful country. She initially uses her position to bully Tiffania for her recent popularity, and Guiche warns Saito not to confront her. After learning that Tiffania is a half-elf, she captures her and conducts a "heresy trial" so that Tiffania must prove her loyalty to the humans' deity or be forced to leave. However, when Louise pointed out that Beatrice was lying about having the religious authority to conduct such a trial, the other students turned on her and gave Tiffania the right to choose Beatrice's punishment, but instead Tiffania forgives Beatrice and asks to be friends.

Malicorne

 is a portly magic student at the Academy of Magic by Tristain where it is part of the Undine Knights under Guiche. Malicorne's familiar is an owl, named Cubasil. He possesses a far vision spell that lets him visualize at least 15 miles. He had a crush on Tabitha's familiar Illococo but finds out she is a dragon in a human form.

Tiffania

 is a well-endowed Half-Elf who joins the cast in the third anime season. Saito remembers her as "the Big-breasted fairy who restored his life" during the war between Tristain and Albion. Tiffania's parents were the Archduke of Albion and an elf woman who is his mistress; she and Henrietta are cousins since her father is Henrietta's uncle. Tiffania's magic comes from a ring her late mother left her; however, when she revived Saito, the gemstone on the ring was consumed. She later discovers she is a Void Mage, sought out by Sheffield and Joseph, with the spell of 'Memory Wipe' that erases people's short-term memories and magical compulsions, and that her familiar is Saito, who as a result, has two masters. Also, her confused feelings for Saito are realized during the fourth season.

After her royal heritage of Albion is recognized by Henrietta, Tiffania moves to the Academy, where she was ostracized at first due to her elven origin, but was later accepted with Saito's help. Her beauty and kindness are a source of admiration for many of her classmates at the Academy, and just like all other women who gets close to Saito, she is a constant source of jealousy for Louise. Tiffania is rather naive for her age. Unlike Saito's promise to Louise, though, which was because he truly loved her, Saito's promise, "I will protect you", to Tiffania was only due to eternal gratitude for resurrecting him.
Her Princesse no Rondo album was released on 3 September 2008 and charted at #160 on 15 September. Her F drama CD album with Luctiana was released on 21 March 2012.

Reynald

 is a glasses-wearing student introduced in the third anime season as one of the Undine Knights under Guiche. He is quite clever and good friends with his fellow students, such as Gimili who is also member of the Undine Knights.

Plebeians

Siesta
 
  is a maid at the Academy. She loves Saito and treats him kindly. She seems to know how poorly Saito is treated by Louise, and she is sure that she would make Saito much happier than Louise does. She is the eldest of eight children, and her hometown is Tarbes ("Talb" in Geneon anime). Towards the end of the first season, Siesta learns that her great-grandfather, Takeo Sasaki, was a Japanese Naval Ensign from World War II who piloted a Mitsubishi A6M Zero Fighter plane into Halkeginia and did not return to Japan; this explains why her hair and eyes are similar to Saito's. In the second anime season, she becomes more romantically aggressive and determined to win Saito's heart even though Saito has declared his love for Louise; Siesta even confesses her love to Saito and kisses him. After Saito is knighted, Siesta becomes his personal maid as ordered by Henrietta. Sometimes she intentionally allows Saito to be mistreated, so she can take care of him afterwards. Her name is based on the siesta in Spain.

In Alexandre Dumas' The Three Musketeers, d'Artagnan states that he comes from Tarbes in Gascony, which is possibly why it was used as the name for Siesta's home town.
Her character CD, which she shares with Siesta, was released on 21 September 2006 and charted at #213 on the Oricon Singles Chart on 2 October. Her solo character CD, released on 24 October 2007, charted at #229 on the Oricon Singles Chart on 5 November. Her Princesse no Rondo album was released on 24 September 2008 and charted at #161 on 6 October. Her F drama CD album with Tabitha was released on 21 March 2012.

Scarron
 
  runs the pub Miwaku no Yousei which is similar to the modern day maid cafe with all the waitresses dressed in colorful and revealing maid uniforms. Although he is muscular, he speaks and gestures effeminately and asks his workers to refer to him as "ma madamoiselle," and has a habit of saying "Tres Bien!." He is also the father of Jessica and is later revealed to be Siesta's uncle, except people deny it because of his character. His employees take part being actors of a play too, and even come to feature Saito in it due to his heroic rise.

Jessica
 
  is Scarron's daughter, and the draw at their pub. She is Siesta's first cousin on her maternal side, and she is also descended from Japanese. Like Siesta, she seems to be fond of Saito and uses her shapely chest to charm him.

Staff

Osmond
 
  is the elderly, white-haired headmaster of the Tristain Academy of Magic. He initially shows a serious side, but is also perverted, as he uses his mouse familiar to peek at Longueville's panties. He is a smart and powerful square mage that Henrietta finds trustworthy. 30 years before the start of the series, he was fighting a dragon but was saved by a man from another world (an American soldier from the Vietnam War) who used a  M72 LAW rocket launcher that Osmond dubbed the 'Staff of Destruction'. His element is wind magic. He entrusts the Founder’s Prayer Book to Louise when he learns that she is a user of Void.

Jean Colbert
 
  is a professor at the Tristain Academy of Magic who is interested in history; his element specialty is fire magic. He is one of the few people that Saito have in common with. His interest in technology from Saito's world helped him create dragon's blood (actually gasoline) to fuel an airplane. It is revealed that he was the captain of the magic troops sent to burn Agnès' village, D'Angleterre, 20 years ago, but also the person who rescued her, when he found out the village wasn't "plagued", and devoted himself to atone for the sin he committed. He has an anti-war attitude, and is envious when he finds out that modern Japan is not ravaged by war. He reveals himself as the Flame Snake when Albion sends hired mercenaries to attack Tristain Academy, and sacrifices himself to protect Agnès. In the third season, Colbert surprises everyone as he returns with Kirche to Tristain Academy; he had Tabitha cast a spell to fake his death, and was staying with Kirche's family. He constructed a giant airship called the "Ostland", based on Saito's Zero Fighter.

 In the novels, Tabitha did not cast a spell on Colbert. Instead, Kirche tricks Agnès into thinking that he is dead. Louise and Saito were also not present during the Academy invasion. He is likely named after Jean-Baptiste Colbert, finance minister to Louis the XIV from 1665 to 1683.

Chevreuse
 
  is a new professor at the Tristain Academy of Magic. Nicknamed The Red Earth Chevreuse, she specializes in earth type magic.

Fouquet

 Osmond's attractive bespectacled secretary with dark green hair, she is introduced under the name . She is normally calm and friendly, but becomes angry and violent whenever Osmond tries any lecherous moves on her. She is able to use magic due to coming from a noble family who lost their rank. In the season 1 storyline, she reveals herself to be Fouquet the Sculptor, a triangle mage who summons a giant earth golem to steal the Staff of Destruction, and stages a fight between her golem and Louise and her classmates to try to discover how to use the Staff. After observing Saito firing it, Fouquet snatches the Staff and fires it at him, but fails because there was only one projectile. Fouquet is then arrested, but later escapes; she joins Reconquista, and assists Cromwell and Wardes, who refers to her as Matilda of Sachsen-Gotha. Although Kirche and the students call her an old woman, Fouquet adamantly replies that she isn't old and that she is only 23. In the light novels, Fouquet would turn walls and doors into dirt and steal valuables from noble's homes. She also has a childish side implied by leaving messages whenever she completes a robbery. Fouquet was stated as part of high-class Albion nobility.
 She is likely named after Nicolas Fouquet, a corrupt government official under Cardinal Mazarin and an underage Louis the XIV who most famously accumulated a large fortune while serving as finance minister until his eventual arrest in 1661.

Other characters

Tristain

Henrietta

 is introduced as the princess of Tristain; her element is water magic. She is loved by her nationals and is a childhood friend of Louise. She defends Tristain from the Albion invasion after the assassination of her lover, Prince Wales. Her role is developed more in season two, where she is crowned queen (although Louise and her friends still refer to her as Princess), and must deal with an impending war against Albion. In the manga, Louise succeed in delivering Wales' letter; however, Henrietta renounces her marriage unable to ignore the crisis in Tristain.

Henrietta seems to be friendly with Saito, even though she was unintentionally kissed by Saito on the lips in the first season. She envies Louise for her bravery. In Season 2, Henrietta has Saito be her bodyguard to counteract a spy, but they find themselves in some heavy but feigned romantic situations: when she is walking with Saito on the street and pretends to be his lover, she puts his hand on her chest; when the guards barge into the inn room where she and Saito are hiding, she passionately makes out with him. In Season 3, Henrietta starts showing romantic feelings to the point where Louise considers her a love rival. At the Slepnir Ball, Henrietta disguises herself as Louise, receiving a hug and a kiss from Saito. When asked to intrude Gallia to recover Tabitha, Henrietta refuses, and in the process, holds Saito's hands, which shocks Louise, Saito and even Henrietta herself when she realizes it. She tells Louise she does not know whether she is rebounding from Wales or if she is truly falling for him. In Season 4, Henrietta grants Saito ownership of De Ornielle (a derelict mansion since there was no successor for it previously) after his deeds in saving Romalia. Beneath De Ornielle, Saito discovers a secret room where Henrietta's paternal family used to rendezvous with their genuine mistresses, most likely because of forced engagements. She admits she has feelings for Saito. They kissed each other, and Louise discovered them. Louise is not happy about this, and they had a brief fight over it. Ultimately, Louise accepts her feelings for Saito, but slaps Henrietta for "using her familiar."

Henrietta's feelings for Saito are made more apparent in the light novels. Saito was initially determined to not go further with Henrietta, but Henrietta just wanted to "spend a few moments of happiness" with him. Henrietta is named after Princess Henriette Anne Stuart of England from 1644 to 1670, a Princess of England and Scotland, cousin of Louis XIV and wife of his brother, Philippe of France.
 Her character CD, which she shares with Siesta, was released on 21 September 2006 and charted at #213 on the Oricon Singles Chart on 2 October. Her solo character CD, released on 10 October 2007, charted at #240 on the Oricon Singles Chart on 22 October. Her F drama CD album with Louise was released on 21 March 2012.

Agnès

 is introduced in the second anime season as the Captain of the Tristain musketeers in service of Henrietta. She hates Mages, especially fire-element ones. She is fiercely loyal to Henrietta, who proclaims her one of the few people Henrietta can truly trust, and prefers to use a pistol or sword; she states that in combat, it is quicker than casting a spell. Originally very suspicious of Saito (particularly when she thought he was making a move on Henrietta), over time she comes to accept him as a trusted ally, even mourning his supposed death at the end of Season 2. One of her motives for joining Tristain's army is avenge her parents who died when her village, D'Angleterre, was razed, and she eventually tracks down the people responsible. Her sexual preference is questioned when Siesta speculates to Louise whether Agnès prefers girls; Louise unintentionally affirms it because Agnès had recently kissed Louise on the lips during a spying mission in an attempt to draw attention away from themselves. She kills Lishman, a politician who tricked the government into burning the village, and fights the former vice-captain of the army when he holds the academy girls hostage, but learns the leader of that army, Flame Snake, is the primary man responsible. She then learns Colbert is the Flame Snake but also the one who saved her life after noticing the burn scar on his back. After Colbert sacrifices himself in season 2 but returns in season 3, Agnès gives up thirsting for vengeance; she eventually tells Colbert he has to make amends 'one hundred times' over for each member of her village.

In the novels, Agnès was asked by Henrietta to find Saito after his battle with the Albion army. She found him in Tiffania's village, and discovered he had lost his Gandálfr powers. She then trains Saito in swordsmanship, with some success.

Eleonore and Cattleya

Eléonore is very strict, strong-willed, and even uses a whip. Her personality is stronger than "Chibi-Louise's" in all aspects, except that she looks down on commoners such as Saito. She has a passionate nature sometimes expressed through her dreams; after her engagement was called off by her lover, she becomes infuriated whenever the topic comes up, insisting that Louise get married. She and Cattleya join the magic academy during the second anime season to watch over Louise. By the end of season 4, Eléonore finally accepts Louise's feelings for Saito.
Cattleya is more easy-going and gentle towards Louise and her friends than Eléonore, and Saito notes the latter also has a large chest. She uses Earth magic and is often seen with a variety of small pets and animals. She is also introduced in the second season of the anime. More than anything, she longs for Louise’s happiness, and is fine with the fact that Louise has feelings for Saito.
The sisters' character CD, which they share with their younger sister Louise, was released on 24 October 2007.

Wardes

 is introduced as the Captain of Tristain's Magic Guard, known as the Griffin Knights. He claims to be Louise's fiancé since he befriended her as young girl. He is a highly skilled swordsman who also uses magic to easily defeat Saito in their first practice match. He escorts Louise to Albion, but misleads her into thinking Saito and friends have left them. After Louise meets with Wales, Wardes insists on marrying her right away at Albion. He then stops her from delivering Wales's reply letter. After capturing her, he reveals he is part of the Reconquista faction and a traitor. Both the novel and anime imply that he is aware of Louise's potential as a Void Mage and interested in her primarily for that reason. At the wedding, Wardes stands with a spell-bound Louise, but it is interrupted when Saito barges in and frees Louise from the spell. He takes the opportunity to kill Wales. Saito eventually defeats Wardes with a cut to his hand, however, Wardes escapes. In the novels, Saito and Wardes reach a stalemate when fighting during the war. In the anime, Wardes is killed by Louise's revealed Void Magic: "Explosion".
It is possible that Wardes is named for "the Comte de Wardes", a villainous character who appears in Alexandre Dumas père''s "Musketeer" novels, but this has not been verified.

Gallia

Sheffield

, a mysterious beauty, is introduced as Cromwell's secretary in the Reconquista faction, but she later kills Cromwell after he is captured by Tristain and takes possession of the Ring of Andavari, which furthers the war between Albion and Tristain. Sheffield poisons South Gotha's water supply so those who drink it will also revolt against Tristania and Queen Henrietta. Her power allows her to use any magical artifact and gives her insight into magic theory. She later reveals that her master is Joseph, the current King of Gallia, who is searching for other Void mages. She served Joseph out of a desire to be loved by him.

Joseph

 Former king of Gallia and Sheffield's master as well as Tabitha's uncle. Considered to be cold-blooded amid his hunger for power, it's revealed that he killed Tabitha's father, Charles, due to the efforts to ascend to the throne, and was behind the potion that drove Tabitha's mother insane. He is also a Void Mage with the ability of 'Acceleration', speeding up his movements. He possesses the Founder's Music Box. Throughout the majority of Joseph's part in the story, in his heart there is nothing: no tears, or sorrow, a true 'Void' in his heart. The conviction is when he caused destruction in Romalia that his motive was to see if any sense of remorse is within himself. Sheffied captured Louise and hands her over to him to copy her Explosion spell, though Louise was later rescued by Saito and Tabitha. He literally dies, along with his beloved Sheffield, by a detonated Firestone after he could finally feel emotion.

In the novel, Joseph is married and has a daughter named Isabella. Angered by her father Joseph's death, Isabella initially was cold and rude to Tabitha but when brought to Tabitha's mother, she realized that they were the only family left and felt a change in her heart. She then decided to become a nun to compensate for her father's sins.

Gensou siblings
The Gallia Knights, also known as the Elemental Siblings, are mercenaries that first appear in the fourth season. King Joseph had them steal the Founder's Round Mirror and hand it over to him. Bleu and Jeanette are happy  fighting with Saito and capturing Louise. Jack summons golems similar to Guiche's Valkyries. Once they'd fought with them at De Ornielle, but Damiem put a stop to it since it's not actually worth any money. Tabitha hires their help in the battle with the Ancient Dragon at the school after she became the queen of Gallia.

Albion

Wales
 
  is the Prince of Albion and Henrietta's cousin. Three years ago, Henrietta makes a vow of love at Lake Longorian to always be together with him, but Wales does not reciprocate; he promises instead to walk alongside her, and to not worry others. When Louise delivers Henrietta's letter, Wales tells her of the conspiring Reconquista faction. He presides over Wardes and Louise's wedding, but after Saito interrupts the ceremony, Wardes betrays him and kills Wales, devastating Henrietta when she hears the news. However, in a later episode, Wales appears to be alive before Henrietta, and takes her to the lake to renew their vows, but he is actually under the control of Sheffield and Cromwell, who have used the Ring of Andvari to give him a false life. Louise eventually stops him with some high powered dispel magic. Wales is freed from the ring's control; he asks Henrietta to change her promise so she can fall in love with someone else, and his false life expires.
 Wales is a triangle wind mage, but in the second season, he showed that nobles of royal heritage can combine their magical power with other royals; with Henrietta he creates hexagonal class magic, which combines wind and water.

Cromwell
 
  is the leader of Reconquista who is responsible for the Albion war. He is the one who gave the orders to Wardes to kill the Prince of Albion. He also uses the 'Ring of Andvari' that they stole from the Water Spirit to control people. In the light novels, he is killed during Gallia's bombardment of his HQ after Gallia reneges on the secret treaty. In the anime, he is defeated by Louise's classmates in the invasion of Tristain and thrown in jail, but during the events of Henrietta's coronation, he is killed in his cell by Sheffield, who has reclaimed the ring. Cromwell is named after Oliver Cromwell, a political leader in England in the 17th century.

Romalia

Julio
 
  is a knight from the Holy Empire of Romalia sent as transfer student to Tristain Magic Academy. Julio is sent by Romalia's Pope as his support for Henrietta's expedition to Albion, now in political strife after the fall of the royal family followed by the death of Reconquista's leader. In one instance, he single-handedly defeated nine dragon knights of Albion. He is sometimes treated with disdain by others because he's a priest. In the novels, he is also portrayed as rather manipulative. He is named after Julius Caesar.

Although not a mage, Julio is a dragon knight and expert swordsman. During his duel with Saito to win Louise's kiss, Julio could have easily won against Saito—who does not use Gandalfr's skill, but he let Saito win to tease him. He has beautiful looks and a personality that grants him popularity among girls. He can be considered a replacement for Guiche after his depart to the military service because he is similar to Guiche in looks—however, Julio is worldly, as opposed to the vain, foolish Guiche, and hardly had to exert effort to charm most of the female students in the Academy.

In the anime, Julio initially pursues Louise, although on multiple occasions, he helps fix Louise and Saito's relationship. In the novels, he falls in love with Josette, the twin sister of Tabitha. Julio also became Josette's familiar as the second Myozunitonirun, after the deaths of Joseph and Sheffield.
His F drama CD album with Guiche and Saito was released on 21 March 2012.

Vittorio

 is the Pope of Romalia who holds the titles of 'St. Aegis the 32nd' and the 'Shield of the Founder', assumed the duties of the throne three years prior to Saito's summoning. He is introduced in the anime in Season 4 when Saito, Louise, and Tiffania were invited at his Cathedral. His appearance is even more of a 'bishounen' than Julio, and he is slightly over 20 years old. He is kind-hearted in that he cares for orphans and is trying to increase the welfare of the commoners, but has to deal with politicking with the nobles in the process. He is a Void user with magic of disintegration, originally the spell of ‘Recovery’, which has an incinerating effect on evil entities. Julio serves as his familiar. Vittorio possesses the Founder's Round Mirror until it was stolen from a treasure room; the mirror allowed the user to look into the past of the Founder Brimir and see the actions of his lifetime. He understands how atrocious his actions are, and knows eventually he will have to step on the path Founder Brimir actions are necessary to save humanity.

In the novel, Vittorio's mother had stolen the Ruby of Fire ring from him and escaped to D'Angleterre to hide, which resulted in burning the entire village by Colbert and his troops to prevent the spread of the 'New Religion.' She merely didn't want her own son to follow Brimir's footsteps, as it would just to be a burden. However, Vittorio was not saddened by his mother's death. In the anime, Vittorio sacrifice himself to the Ancient Dragon to save Julio’s life.

Elves

Bidashal

 is an Elf. He appears to be a bit affiliated to King Joseph of Gallia, though he doesn't take orders from him. He is Luctiana's uncle, and possesses very strong Elf Magic, such as being able to repel a strong attack with Counter from Tabitha without moving an inch. He is also part of the Elvin community in a private oasis in the middle Elvish desert territory, Nephthys. In the fourth season, he makes three Firestones similar to small A-Bombs created from both Void and Elven magic for King Joseph. King Joseph uses them on Romalia as part of his plot. After the incident and Joseph's death, Bidashal gives Tabitha the antidote to cure her mother. He allows Luctiana to keep Tiffania and Saito contain in Nephthys for personal research on humans. He later helps them escape through an underground chamber after realizing the true nature of Void magic. Bidashal saves Henrietta and her fleet from the Ancient Dragon's fireball.

Luctiana

 is Bidashal's niece. She is an Elf who is interested in researching humans and their culture. Luctiana and Arie kidnap Tiffania and Saito because they are a Void mage and Gandláfr; additionally that Saito from another world. She keeps them at a private oasis where Saito discovers a submerged fighter jet. She shows the capability of using magic quite successfully during times of great stress. Later, the Elves at the council try to have Tiffania and Saito terminated, but Luctiana and Bidashal were against it. They help them escape through underground. She and Arie join them later with Louise and the gang on the Ostland much to her excitement to see more of the human world.
Her F drama CD album with Tiffania was released on 21 March 2012.

Arie

 is an Elf and Luctiana's fiancé. He and Luctiana went to the De Ornielle mansion to capture Tiffania and end up kidnapping Saito as well. He shows the capability of using magic swords. Arie reluctantly goes with the humans after escaping the Elves territory with Saito and Tiffania. As they went to Tabitha's coronation in Gallia, Arie quickly learns that humans are not much different compared to elves. Later, Arie and Guiche get along after seeing Guiche's relationship with Montmorency is similar to his own with Luctiana.

Familiars

Sylphid

Voiced by: Satomi Arai (Sylphid) / Yuka Iguchi (Illococoo)
 is a rare female Rhyme Dragon and Tabitha's familiar. Sylphid doesn't live in the Academy like other familiars because she is too big, so she stays in a neighboring forest. When Tabitha is captured during the third season, Sylphid escape and notifies Louise and friends by assuming the form of a blue-haired girl named  who claims to be Tabitha's little sister. Though she is sensible, she appears sometimes childish, such as showing no embarrassment when first appearing in the Academy Court Yard naked in front of Saito and the others, because as a dragon she goes about naked all the time. Illococoo promised her "older sister" that she would not tell anybody about her ability to use shape-shifting magic, but Derflinger is aware of her true nature and ensures that the others become aware of it too.

Sasha
 is a female Elf who was one of Founder Brimir's familiars – Gandálfr. She made a pact with Brimir to allow him to experiment on her but he instead made her his familiar, something Sasha was not pleased about. She was the person who created the talking sword Derflinger as well as the first wielder. Despite already being a Gandálfr, Sasha was Lífþrasir as well, similar to her successor Saito Hiraga 6,000 years later. Sasha killed Brimir by stabbing Derflinger into his heart while he tried to kill off the elves for reasons not yet revealed as of the 19th light novel. In his defense, Brimir meant no harm to come to Sasha when he made her his familiar. Although her backstory was never mentioned in the animation.

Other

Brimir
, was the first Void mage. In his youth, he was absent-minded genius not unlike Colbert. He made a pact with Sasha. He is considered a founder of the familiar system for a mage's protector, establishing Romalia with the assistance of his apprentice, and had three children that would flourish the royal families of Tristain, Albion, and Gallia. Humans from the Holy Land were exiled by elves borders. Retaking his homeland came with an unwilling decision to annihilate elves, as Brimir wished with all his heart to not have to commit such atrocities. According to his profile, history simply concluded that Sasha was Brimir's lover: meaning that Halkagenian royal families are related to the elves.

Works cited

The Familiar of Zero anime

Season 1
 EP 1:  "Louise the Zero"
 EP 2:  "Commoner Familiar"
 EP 3:  "Feverish Tempation"
 EP 5:  "Tristein's Princess"
 EP 6:  "A Thief's Identity"
 EP 7:  "Louise's Part-Time Job"
 EP 8:  "Tabitha's Secret"
 EP 9:  "Louise's Change of Heart"
 EP 10:  "A Princess' Request"
 EP 11:  "Louise's Marriage"
 EP 12:  "Zero Treasure"
 EP 13:  "Louise the Void"

Season 2: Futatsuki no Kishi 
 EP 1:  "Her Majesty, the Queen's Zero"
 EP 2:  "The Oath of Wind and Water"
 EP 3:  "The Paladin's Sword"
 EP 4:  "The Three Vallière Sisters"
 EP 5:  "The Spy's Seal"
 EP 6:  "The Queen's Vacation"
 EP 7:  "The Underground Secret Document"
 EP 8:  "The Magic Institute's Crisis"
 EP 9:  "The Atonement of Flames"
 EP 10:  "The Enemy on Snowy Alps"
 EP 11:  "The Silver Pentecost"
 EP 12:  "The Farewell Wedding Ceremony"

Season 3: Princesse no Rondo
 EP 1:  "The Familiar's Mark"
 EP 2:  "The Elf of the Forest"
 EP 3:  "The Return of the Hero"
 EP 4:  "The Rumored Accepted Student"
 EP 5:  "The Alluring Women's Bath"
 EP 6:  "Forbidden Magic Drug"
 EP 7:  "Slepnir Ball"
 EP 8:  "The Eastern Pursuit!"
 EP 9:  "Tabitha's Younger Sister"
 EP 10:  "Border Mountain Pass"
 EP 11:  "Captive in Al Hambra"
 EP 12:  "Wings of Freedom"
 OVA 6.5:  "Seductive Beach"

Season 4: The Familiar of Zero F 
 EP 1:  "Louise of the Holy Ground"
 EP 2:  "Aquileia's Shrine Maiden"
 EP 3:  "The Incompetent King Gone Mad"
 EP 4:  "The Queen's Reward"
 EP 5:  "The Maidens of De Ornielle"
 EP 6:  "Trouble at the Outdoor Bath"
 EP 7:  "Elves from the Desert"
 EP 8:  "Escape Through the Sewer"
 EP 9:  "Tabitha's Coronation"
 EP 10:  "The Awakening of Calamity"
 EP 11:  "Louise's Choice"
 EP 12:  "The Familiar of Zero"

Light novels 

 Vol. 1:  
 Vol. 2:  
 Vol. 3:

References

External links

Familiar of Zero